Harman H. Vanderzee (born 1804-05) was an American politician who attended the 88th New York State Legislature.

Life 
Vanderzee was born in 1804 or 1805. He was a farmer and lived in Feura Bush. During the 88th New York State Legislature, he represented the 1st district of Albany County. He was a Democrat, and was elected by a margin of 1,611 votes.

References 

19th-century American politicians
Democratic Party members of the New York State Assembly